This is a list of notable footballers who have played for U.S. Catanzaro 1929. This means players that have played 100 or more official matches for the club in Serie A or Serie B.

For a list of all Catanzaro players, major or minor, with a Wikipedia article, see :Category:U.S. Catanzaro 1929 players; for records and statistics see List of U.S. Catanzaro 1929 records and statistics; for a selected list of the best players in Catanzaro's history, see U.S. Catanzaro 1929 Hall of Fame. For a list of players with less than 100 matches played, see List of U.S. Catanzaro 1929 players (25–99 appearances).

Players are listed as of 25 February 2023 and according to the date of their first-team debut for the club. Appearances and goals are for first-team competitive matches in Serie A or Serie B only; wartime matches are excluded. Substitute appearances included.

The player with the most league appearances (Serie A or B) is Adriano Banelli with 334. The player with the most league goals (Serie A or B) is Massimo Palanca with 97.

Key 
 GK – Goalkeeper
 DF – Defender
 MF – Midfielder
 FW – Forward

Players 
Nationality column refers to the country (countries) represented internationally by the player, if any.

Source:calcio-seriea.net

Captains
This is a list of all club captains from 1957. The captains listed are for the league season not individual matches and appearances and goals are for all competitive league games only. No cup or other official tournament matches are included in the statistics.

Notes

References 

 calcio-seriea.net

Players
 
Catanzaro
Association football player non-biographical articles